The Oxford University Gazette (often simply known as the Gazette locally) is the publication of record for the University of Oxford in England, used for official announcements. It is published weekly during term time.

The Gazette has been published continuously since 1870. It provides information such as the following:

The Gazette is published weekly throughout the University's academic year (from September to July), but less regularly during the University's vacation periods. A number of supplements are also published giving various types of official information. Subscribers to the Gazette  also receive Blueprint, the University's staff newsletter, and The Oxford Magazine.

Most of the material in the Gazette is available on the World Wide Web. However, due to the UK Data Protection Act some of the printed version of the Gazette has not been included online since September 2001. The Gazette is published by the Oxford University Press.

References

External links
 Oxford University Gazette website
 Latest issue

Gazette
Publications established in 1870
1870 establishments in England
Gazettes
Oxford University Press
Newspapers published in Oxford